Juan María "Flaco" Traverso (born 28 December 1950 in Ramallo, Buenos Aires Province), is a retired racing driver from Argentina. He is a multiple champion in the most important championships in Argentina. He also raced in European Formula Two in 1979.

Statistics

TC2000
 Races: 304
 Wins: 68
 First win: September 28, 1980 - Ford Taunus - Las Flores circuit
 Pole positions: 73
 Fastest laps: 58
 Titles: 7 - 6 with Renault Fuego (1986, 1988, 1990, 1991, 1992 and 1993) and 1 with Peugeot 405 (1995)
 Cars: Ford Taunus (Official team) (1980–83), Ford Taunus (Akel team) (1984), Renault 18 (Berta team) (1985), Renault Fuego (Official team) (1986–1993), Peugeot 405 (Semi-official team) (1994–1997), Honda Civic Coupe (Official team) (1998), Mitsubishi Lancer (Official team) (1999), Toyota Corolla (Official team) (2000–02), Mitsubishi Lancer (GF Motorsport team) (2002).

Turismo Carretera
 Races: 235
 Wins: 46
 Heat wins: 60
 First win: October 29, 1972 - Renault Torino - 25 de Mayo circuit
 Pole positions: 20
 Fastest laps: 18
 Podiums: 86
 Titles: 6 - 3 with Ford (1977, 1978 and 1999) and 3 with Chevrolet (1995, 1996 and 1997)
 Cars: Renault Torino (private team) (1971–73), Ford Falcon (Official team) (1973–1978), Ford Falcon (West team with Oscar Aventin) (1983), Ford Falcon (Degliantoni team) (1983), Renault Torino (invited by Alberto Clerc) (1989), Chevy SS (invited to Buenos Aires Two Hours by Osvaldo Morresi) (1993), Chevy SS (private team) (1994–97), Ford Falcon (private team) (1998–99), Chevy SS (Urtubey Competición team) (2002–03) and Renault Torino-Cherokee (Urtubey Competición team) (2004–05).

Top Race
 Races: 83
 Wins: 19
 First win: February 23, 1997 - Mercedes-Benz 280 - Pinamar circuit
 Titles: 3 - 2 with Mercedes-Benz 280 (1998 and 1999) - 1 with BMW 320i (2003)
 Cars: Mercedes-Benz 280 (1998–99), Peugeot 405 (1999), BMW 320 (2002–03), Citroën C5 (2005)

Club Argentino de Pilotos (CAP)
 Wins: 7
 Cars: Datsun 280 ZX (1982–85) and Nissan 300 ZX (1986)

Rally
 Wins: 3
 Super Prime Tournament wins: 6
 Cars: Renault 18 GTX Class 3 (1987–1992)

European Formula Two
 Best result: 4th in Misano circuit (1979)
 Cars: March 792-Hart (1979)

Italian Gran Turismo
 Wins: 4
 Best championship result: runner-up in 1993
 Cars: Lancia Delta Class 2 Group N

Overall
 Races: 743
 Wins: 155

Racing record

Complete European Formula Two Championship results 
(key) (Races in bold indicate pole position; races in italics indicate fastest lap)

References

Argentine racing drivers
Turismo Carretera drivers
TC 2000 Championship drivers
European Formula Two Championship drivers
World Rally Championship drivers
Argentine rally drivers
Top Race V6 drivers
1950 births
Sportspeople from Buenos Aires Province
Living people